Hugo Biso (born 14 February 1988) is a French slalom canoeist who has competed at the international level since 2005 together with Pierre Picco in the C2 class.

He won five medals at the ICF Canoe Slalom World Championships with three golds (C2 team: 2010, 2014, 2015) and two silvers (C2: 2014, 2015). He also won three golds and a silver at the European Championships.

Biso won the overall World Cup title in the C2 class in 2016.

World Cup individual podiums

References

2010 ICF Canoe Slalom World Championships 11 September 2010 C2 men's team final results. - accessed 11 September 2010.

External links

French male canoeists
Sportspeople from Agen
1988 births
Living people
Medalists at the ICF Canoe Slalom World Championships